Elard Hugo Meyer (6 October 1837 – 11 February 1908) was a German philologist who specialized in Germanic and Indo-European studies.

Biography
Elard Hugo Meyer was born in Bremen, Germany on 6 October 1837. His father was a lawyer who served as the city librarian in Bremen. Gaining his earliest education in Bremen, Meyer studied philology at the universities of Bonn, Tübingen and Berlin. 

From 1860 to 1862, Meyer worked as a research assistant for the historian Johann Martin Lappenberg. Since 1863 he worked as a teacher in Bremen, while publishing essays on a variety of topics, including German and French poetry, the history of Bremen, and life and works of Johann Smidt. From 1875 to 1878, Meyer edited the fourth edition of Jacob Grimm's Deutsche Mythologie.

Meyer fell ill in 1882, and subsequently retired as a teacher and moved to Freiburg. He subsequently published his Indogermanische Mythen (1883-1897), which examined Indo-European mythology. Since 1889, Meyer lectured at the University of Freiburg, and was subsequently appointed Honorary Professor of Folklore there. In this capacity he lectured on Germanic mythology. Since 1898, Meyer published the journal Deutsche Volkskunde. 

Meyer died in Freiburg on 11 February 1908.

Selected works
 Indogermanische Mythen. 2 Bände. Dümmler, Berlin 1883–1987;
 Band 1: Gandharven – Kentauren.
 Band 2: Achilleis.
 Germanische Mythologie (= Lehrbücher der germanischen Philologie. Bd. 1). Mayer & Müller, Berlin 1891.
 Deutsche Volkskunde. Karl J. Trübner, Straßburg 1898 (Reprint). Reprint-Verlag Leipzig, Holzminden 1997, .
 Badisches Volksleben im neunzehnten Jahrhundert. Karl J. Trübner, Straßburg 1900 (Reprint, ergänzt um ein Ortsregister, eine Auswahlbibliografie zur neueren Brauchforschung und einer Kurzbiografie zu E. H. Meyer. (= Forschungen und Berichte zur Volkskunde in Baden-Württemberg. Bd. 8). Theiss, Stuttgart 1984). Digitalisat der Ausgabe von 1900 im Internet Archive
 Mythologie der Germanen, gemeinfasslich vorgestellt. Karl J. Trübner, Straßburg 1903.

See also
 Max Müller
 Georg Hüsing
 Hermann Güntert
 Franz Rolf Schröder

Sources

 Herbert Schwarzwälder: Das Große Bremen-Lexikon. 2., aktualisierte, überarbeitete und erweiterte Auflage. Edition Temmen, Bremen 2003, S. #.
 Patricia Laukó: Die badische Volkskunde, Elard Hugo Meyer und seine Fragebogenaktion 

1837 births
1908 deaths
German folklorists
German philologists
Germanic studies scholars
Germanists
Indo-Europeanists
Mythographers
Humboldt University of Berlin alumni
Writers from Bremen
Writers on Germanic paganism